Harmannsdorf is a municipality of Korneuburg in Austria.

Geography 
It lies about 5 km north of Korneuburg in the Weinviertel in Lower Austria. About 27.59 percent of the municipality is forested.

It has seven subdivisions: Rückersdorf-Harmannsdorf, Hetzmannsdorf, Kleinrötz, Mollmannsdorf, Obergänserndorf, Seebarn, and Würnitz-Lerchenau;

Gallery

References

External links 
 Harmannsdorf Homepage

Cities and towns in Korneuburg District